Wixom is a city in Oakland County in the U.S. state of Michigan. The population of Wixom was 17,193 at the 2020 census.

The city was home to the now-demolished Wixom Assembly Plant, which operated from 1957–2007.  The city is also home to several production and manufacturing businesses, including Trijicon, Discraft, NGK, and Majic Window.

History
The settlement of Wixom dates back to 1831. In the beginning, Wixom was named Sibley's Corners after the first settler, 20 year old philanthropist Alonzo Sibley. Sibley settled in what is today called Commerce Township, where he purchased approximately 80 acres of land. Over time, Sibley purchased about 350 more acres of land. In 1837 Sibley donated a portion of his property for a local cemetery; which was called South Commerce Burial Ground; however, was later changed to Wixom Cemetery. Sibley then became the president of the cemetery association.

The establishment of Wixom as a place started in 1871 when Willard Clark Wixom (son of Ahijah C. Wixom and Lucy Clark) granted a right of way through his property for the Holly, Wayne and Monroe Railroad. Willard platted land on both sides of the railroad near the Novi and Commerce Township border. In 1883, Willard opened his property up to become an important railroad junction to make way for the Michigan Airline Railroad Grand Trunk Western Railroad. With the new junction, Willard located the railroad station, union depot (called Wixom Station) and mail drop at the intersection of his property. The construction of the railroad junction attracted many new business investments, stores, a lumber yard and a cider mill ultimately turning this small village into Michigan's largest grain produce handling points. The name of the town was then change from Sibley's Corners to Wixom. Sadly on Christmas Eve 1901 Willard was struck and killed by a passenger train while crossing the tracks in his horse and buggy.

The village of Wixom was incorporated in the 1950s following the announcement of plans to construct the Wixom Assembly Plant in Novi Township. Prior to that time, Wixom was an unincorporated place. The village borders included portions of both Novi and Commerce Townships. Efforts by the remainder of Novi Township to incorporate as a village prompted the newly established village of Wixom to incorporate as a city. The city largely follows the borders of the village although a small area of parkland on the north side of the city was annexed from Commerce Township in the 1970s.

On November 13, 1996, Gerald Atkins "shot his way" (according to eyewitness reports) into the Ford Wixom Assembly Plant plant with a CAR-15 semi-automatic rifle, eventually killing plant manufacturing manager Darrell Izzard (aged 57) in a hallway; the shooter wounded three others. Fleeing the plant, Atkins hid in storm drain tunnels while law enforcement surrounded the plant and trained their weapons from as far away as the Interstate 96 freeway. Hours later he surrendered.

Downtown development 
The downtown area of the city is being developed with a new main street area on Pontiac Trail by the city offices called the Wixom Village Center. This was a $200 million project. The Village Center includes a pedestrian plaza, restaurants, and service shops. The residential development called Tribute of Wixom will contain 600 units that include ranch-style condos, town houses, and single-family homes. The project was postponed in 2008 and construction did not begin again until 2014.

Education 
Most of Wixom is part of Walled Lake Consolidated Schools. The extreme southwest portion of the city is within the South Lyon Community School District. Additionally a small portion of southern Wixom is in the area of the Novi Community School District.

Schools located in the city limits include Loon Lake Elementary School, Wixom Elementary School, Sarah Banks Middle School, and Wixom Christian School. The Walled Lake district's Twin Sun Preschool is also in Wixom.

Walled Lake district elementary schools serving Wixom include Loon Lake, Wixom, Hickory Woods, and Walled Lake. Most of Wixom is zoned to Banks Middle School, with a small part zoned to Geisler Middle School. Most residents are zoned to Walled Lake Western High School. Some parts of the city are zoned to Walled Lake Central High School.

The portion in the South Lyon district is zoned to Dolsen Elementary School, Centennial Middle School, and South Lyon East High School.

Catholic schools are under the Roman Catholic Archdiocese of Detroit. St. Catherine of Siena Academy is in Wixom.

St. William Catholic Church, which includes Wixom in its service area, operates St. William Catholic School, a K-8 school in Walled Lake.

Religion
St. William Church in Walled Lake includes Wixom in its service area.

Media
The studios of WTVS (Detroit Public Television) are located in the Riley Broadcast Center and HD Studios.

Police and fire 
The police station is located in the newly developing downtown area on Pontiac Trail. The Wixom Police Department was formed on October 14, 1957. Prior to 1958, Wixom received police services from the Oakland County Sheriff's Department.

Wixom is protected by Fire Station #1 on North Wixom Road. The Wixom Fire Department is primarily staffed with paid on-call firefighters in addition to a full-time fire chief, fire marshal, EMT coordinator, and a fire inspector.  The Wixom Firefighters are represented by the Michigan Association of Fire Fighters. 

Wixom Firefighters hold their annual Breakfast with Santa and collect non-perishable food. In a typical year, over 1500 pounds are collected and donated to local food banks.

In 1996, two Wixom police officers, Gary Hamlin and Martin Harp, undertook the dangerous task of apprehending and arresting Gerald Atkins (the above-mentioned Ford plant killer) as he sought refuge in a large storm drain.  For their bravery and heroism they received awards and commendations, including official thanks in the form of resolutions passed by the state legislature and the National Association of Police Organizations TOP COPS award, which was given during a ceremony at the White House, conducted by president Bill Clinton.

Geography

Demographics

2010 census
As of the census of 2010, there were 13,498 people, 5,725 households, and 3,382 families residing in the city. The racial makeup of the city was 79.8% White, 11.1% African American, 0.2% Native American, 4.9% Asian, 1.9% from other races, and 2.1% from two or more races. Hispanic or Latino of any race were 5.1% of the population.

There were 5,725 households, of which 33.6% had children under the age of 18 living with them, 44.0% were married couples living together, 10.9% had a female householder with no husband present, 4.1% had a male householder with no wife present, and 40.9% were non-families. 34.2% of all households were made up of individuals, and 5.3% had someone living alone who was 65 years of age or older. The average household size was 2.36 and the average family size was 3.09.

The median age in the city was 34.8 years. 25.4% of residents were under the age of 18; 9.3% were between the ages of 18 and 24; 31.9% were from 25 to 44; 26.4% were from 45 to 64; and 7% were 65 years of age or older. The gender makeup of the city was 49.9% male and 50.1% female.

2000 census
As of the census of 2000, there were 13,263 people, 5,889 households, and 3,150 families residing in the city. The racial makeup of the city was 90.40% White, 2.50% African American, 0.51% Native American, 2.85% Asian, 0.04% Pacific Islander, 1.55% from other races, and 2.14% from two or more races. Hispanic or Latino of any race were 3.20% of the population.

There were 5,889 households, out of which 30.9% had children under the age of 18 living with them, 41.8% were married couples living together, 8.0% had a female householder with no husband present, and 46.5% were non-families. 37.4% of all households were made up of individuals, and 4.1% had someone living alone who was 65 years of age or older.  The average household size was 2.24 and the average family size was 3.07.

In the city, the population was spread out, with 24.9% under the age of 18, 14.0% from 18 to 24, 39.1% from 25 to 44, 16.5% from 45 to 64, and 5.4% who were 65 years of age or older.  The median age was 30 years. For every 100 females, there were 109.5 males.  For every 100 females age 18 and over, there were 108.0 males.

The median income for a household in the city was $44,320, and the median income for a family was $64,918. Males had a median income of $45,798 versus $30,942 for females. The per capita income for the city was $27,543.  About 4.5% of families and 5.4% of the population were below the poverty line, including 4.0% of those under age 18 and 2.2% of those age 65 or over.

References

External links

City of Wixom
Oakland County
Wixom Public Library
Wixom Parks & Recreation
Walled Lake Consolidated School District
Wixom Association of Professional Firefighters

Cities in Oakland County, Michigan
Metro Detroit
Populated places established in 1831
1831 establishments in Michigan Territory